HTVC010P is a virus which was discovered by Stephen Giovannoni and colleagues at Oregon State University. The Economist reports that a February 2013 paper in Nature says that "it probably really is the commonest organism on the planet".  It is a bacteriophage that infects the extremely abundant bacteria Pelagibacter ubique in the Pelagibacterales order.

References

Bacteriophages